The Bombing of La Garriga were a series of Nationalist air raids which took place at La Garriga, Barcelona province in Catalonia between 28 and 29 January 1939 during the Spanish Civil War. At least 13 civilians were killed in the bombings.

Background.

On 26 January the Nationalist troops occupied Barcelona and 28 January Granollers, but they halted their offensive briefly. The Republican civilians and soldiers fled to the north and the Nationalist air force, the Legion Condor and the Aviazione Legionaria bombed the roads and towns between Barcelona and the French Frontier.

The bombing

La Garriga was a tiny town of 10,000 inhabitants (among them 7,000 refugees from Madrid and the Basque Country), without air defenses. On 28 January the retreating Lister's troops left the town and fled to the north and the following day ten Italian Savoia-Marchetti bombers, bombed the town. On 29 January, the Italian bombers, attacked the town again. There were 13 civilian deaths, among them five refugees and seven children.

Aftermath
The Nationalist troops occupied La Garriga on 1 February.

See also 

 Aviazione Legionaria

Notes

1939 in Spain
Conflicts in 1939
Explosions in 1939
Battles of the Spanish Civil War
Strategic bombing operations and battles
Spanish Civil War massacres
Mass murder in 1939
Province of Barcelona
History of Catalonia
Airstrikes during the Spanish Civil War
January 1939 events
Airstrikes conducted by Italy